Coon Butt is a summit in Blount County, Tennessee, in the United States. It is located within Great Smoky Mountains National Park.

Coon Butt has been noted for its unusual place name.

References

Mountains of Blount County, Tennessee
Mountains of Tennessee
Mountains of Great Smoky Mountains National Park